Psalm 10 is the tenth psalm of the Book of Psalms, beginning in English in the King James Version: "Why standest thou afar off, O LORD? why hidest thou thyself in times of trouble?" In the Greek Septuagint and the Latin Vulgate, it is not an individual psalm but the second part of psalm 9, "Ut quid Domine recessisti". These two consecutive psalms have the form of a single acrostic Hebrew poem. Compared to Psalm 9, Psalm 10 is focused more on the individual than the collective human condition. 

The psalm forms a regular part of Jewish, Catholic, Lutheran, Anglican and other Protestant liturgies.

Text

King James Version 
 Why standest thou afar off, O LORD? why hidest thou thyself in times of trouble?
 The wicked in his pride doth persecute the poor: let them be taken in the devices that they have imagined.
 For the wicked boasteth of his heart's desire, and blesseth the covetous, whom the LORD abhorreth.
 The wicked, through the pride of his countenance, will not seek after God: God is not in all his thoughts.
 His ways are always grievous; thy judgments are far above out of his sight: as for all his enemies, he puffeth at them.
 He hath said in his heart, I shall not be moved: for I shall never be in adversity.
 His mouth is full of cursing and deceit and fraud: under his tongue is mischief and vanity.
 He sitteth in the lurking places of the villages: in the secret places doth he murder the innocent: his eyes are privily set against the poor.
 He lieth in wait secretly as a lion in his den: he lieth in wait to catch the poor: he doth catch the poor, when he draweth him into his net.
 He croucheth, and humbleth himself, that the poor may fall by his strong ones.
 He hath said in his heart, God hath forgotten: he hideth his face; he will never see it.
 Arise, O LORD; O God, lift up thine hand: forget not the humble.
 Wherefore doth the wicked contemn God? he hath said in his heart, Thou wilt not require it.
 Thou hast seen it; for thou beholdest mischief and spite, to requite it with thy hand: the poor committeth himself unto thee; thou art the helper of the fatherless.
 Break thou the arm of the wicked and the evil man: seek out his wickedness till thou find none.
 The LORD is King for ever and ever: the heathen are perished out of his land.
 LORD, thou hast heard the desire of the humble: thou wilt prepare their heart, thou wilt cause thine ear to hear:
 To judge the fatherless and the oppressed, that the man of the earth may no more oppress.

Context 
Psalm 8 reflects on man's special place in creation. In contrast, both psalms 9 and 10 will end with statements setting mankind in a more negative light in the final verses of each. Psalm 9 closes with the phase "Put them in fear, O Lord: that the nations may know themselves to be but men, selah"  Psalm 9:20  and Psalm 10:18 closes Psalm 10 with "...that the man of the earth may no more oppress." Some speculate that the final word of Psalm 9, selah, possibly meaning "a pause", might link the two psalms 9 and 10 together.

Taken together, Psalms 9 and 10 comprise a continuous acrostic psalm in the Hebrew alphabet. Some texts, such as the Septuagint, combine them. They also contrast as Psalm 9 is more victorious and 10 more of a lament.

Uses

Judaism
This psalm is recited during the Ten Days of Repentance in some traditions.
Verse 16 forms parts of the eighth and ninth verses of Yehi Kivod in Pesukei Dezimra, part of Baruch Hashem L'Olam in Maariv, and part of the Bedtime Shema.
Verse 17 is found in the repetition of the Amidah during Rosh Hashanah.

New Testament
Verses 7 is quoted in Romans

Catholic Church
According to the Rule of St. Benedict (530 AD), Psalm 1 to Psalm 20 were mainly reserved for the Office of Prime. Psalm 9 is sung in the Latin version translated from the Greek Septuagint, and therefore includes Psalm 10, as noted above. Benedict had divided this Psalm 9/10 in two parts, one sung to the end of the Office of Prime Tuesday and the other ( and ) is the first of the three readings on Wednesday. In other words, the first verses of Psalm 9 until "Quoniam non in finem erit oblivio pauperis: patientia pauperum non peribit in finem," formed the third and final Prime Psalm from Tuesday, the second part of the Psalm (Vulgate according to his view) was recited as the first psalm of the Office of Prime Wednesday.

Traditionally Psalms 9 and 10 were recited as the seventh Psalms of Sunday Matins.

Musical settings 
Heinrich Schütz wrote a setting of a paraphrase of Psalm 10 in German, "Wie meinst du's doch, ach Herr, mein Gott", SWV 106, for the Becker Psalter, published first in 1628.

References

External links 

 
 
 Text of Psalm 10 according to the 1928 Psalter
 Psalms Chapter 10 text in Hebrew and English, mechon-mamre.org
 Why, LORD, do you stand afar and pay no heed in times of trouble? text and footnotes, usccb.org United States Conference of Catholic Bishops
 Psalm 10:1 introduction and text, biblestudytools.com
 Psalm 10 – From Times of Trouble to Calm Confidence enduringword.com
 Psalm 10 / Refrain:  You, Lord, have never failed those who seek you. Church of England
 Psalm 10 at biblegateway.com
 Hymns for Psalm 10 hymnary.org

010
Works attributed to David